Services marketing is a specialized branch of marketing which emerged as a separate field of study in the early 1980s, following the recognition that the unique characteristics of services required different strategies compared with the marketing of physical goods.

Services marketing typically refers to both business to consumer (B2C) and business-to-business (B2B) services, and includes marketing of services such as telecommunications services, financial services, all types of hospitality, tourism leisure and entertainment services, car rental services, health care services, professional services and trade services. Service marketers often use an expanded marketing mix which consists of the seven Ps: product, price, place, promotion, people, physical evidence and process. A contemporary approach, known as service-dominant logic, argues that the demarcation between products and services that persisted throughout the 20th century was artificial and has obscured that everyone sells service. The S-D logic approach is changing the way that marketers understand value-creation and is changing concepts of the consumer's role in service delivery processes.

Services Marketing: definitions

The American Marketing Association defines services marketing as an organizational function and a set of processes for identifying or creating, communicating, and delivering value to customers and for managing customer relationship in a way that benefit the organization and stake-holders. Services are (usually) intangible economic activities offered by one party to another. Often time-based, services performed bring about desired results to recipients, objects, or other assets for which purchasers have responsibility. In exchange for money, time, and effort, service customers expect value from access to goods, labor, professional skills, facilities , networks, and systems; but they do not normally take ownership of any of the physical elements involved.

 A service encounter can be defined as the duration in which a customer interacts with a service. The customer's interactions with a service provider typically involve face-to-face contact with service personnel, in addition to interactions with the physical elements of the service environment including the facilities and equipment.

Concepts of service

Scholars have long debated the nature of services. Some of the earliest attempts to define services focused on what makes them different from goods. Late-eighteenth and early-nineteenth century definitions highlighted the nature of ownership and wealth creation. Classical economists contended that goods were objects of value over which ownership rights could be established and exchanged. Ownership implied possession of a tangible object that had been acquired through purchase, barter or gift from the producer or previous owner and was legally identifiable as the property of the current owner. In contrast, when services were purchased, no title to goods changed hands.

Historical perspectives

Adam Smith's seminal work, The Wealth of Nations (1776), distinguished between the outputs of what he termed "productive" and "unproductive" labor. The former, he stated, produced goods that could be stored after production and subsequently exchanged for money or other items of value. But unproductive labor, however "honourable, ...useful, or... necessary" created services that perished at the time of production and therefore didn't contribute to wealth.

French economist Jean-Baptiste Say argued that production and consumption were inseparable in services, coining the term "immaterial products" to describe them. In the 1920s, Alfred Marshall was still using the idea that services "are immaterial products."

In the mid nineteenth century John Stuart Mill wrote that services are "utilities not fixed or embodied in any object, but consisting of a mere service rendered ...without leaving a permanent acquisition."

Contemporary perspectives

When services marketing emerged as a separate sub-branch within the marketing discipline in the early 1980s, it was largely a protest against the dominance of prevailing product-centric view. In 1960, the US economy changed forever. In that year, for the first time in a major trading nation, more people were employed in the service sector than in manufacturing industries. Other developed nations soon followed by shifting to a service based economy. Scholars soon began to recognise that services were important in their own right, rather than as some residual category left over after goods were taken into account. This recognition triggered a change in the way services were defined. By the mid twentieth century, scholars began defining services in terms of their own unique characteristics, rather than by comparison with products. The following set of definitions shows how scholars were grappling with the distinctive aspects of service products and developing new definitions of service.

 "Goods are produced: services are performed." (Rathmell, 1966) 	
 "A service is an activity or a series of activities which take place in interactions with a contact person or a physical machine and which provides consumer satisfaction." (Lehtinen, 1983 
 "The heart of the service product is the experience of the consumer which takes place in real time... it is the interactive process itself that creates the benefits desired by the consumer." (Bateson, 1992) 
 "Services are deeds, processes and performances." (Zeithmal and Bitner, 1996) 
 "Services are processes (economic activities) that provide time, place, form, problem-solving or experiential value to the recipient." (Lovelock, 2007) 
 "The term 'service'... is synonymous with value. A supplier has a value proposition, but value actualization takes place during the customer's usage and consumption process." (Gummesson, 2008)

Alternative view
A recently proposed alternative view is that services involve a form of rental through which customers can obtain benefits. Customers are willing to pay for aspirational experiences and solutions that add value to their lifestyle. The term, rent, can be used as a general term to describe payment made for use of something or access to skills and expertise, facilities or networks (usually for a defined period of time), instead of buying it outright (which is not even possible in many instances).

There are five broad categories within the non-ownership framework
 Rented goods services: These services enable customers to obtain the temporary right to use a physical good that they prefer not to own (e.g. boats, costumes)
 Defined space and place rentals: These services obtain use of a defined portion of a larger space in a building, vehicle or other area which can be an end in its own right (e.g. storage container in a warehouse) or simply a means to an end (e.g. table in a restaurant, seat in an aircraft)
 Labor and expertise rental: People are hired to perform work that customers either choose not to do for themselves (e.g. cleaning the house) or are unable to do due to the lack of expertise, tools and skills (e.g. car repairs, surgery)
 Access to shared physical environments: These environments can be indoors or outdoors where customers rent the right to share the use of the environment (e.g. museums, theme parks, gyms, golf courses).
 Access to and usage of systems and networks: Customers rent the right to participate in a specified network such as telecommunications, utilities, banking or insurance, with different fees for varying levels of access

Services: Unique characteristics

Throughout the 1980s and 1990s, the so-called unique characteristics of services dominated much of the literature.

The four most commonly cited characteristics of services are:
Intangibility – services lack physical form; they do not interact with any of our senses in a conventional way, they cannot be touched or held. 
 Implications of intangibility: Ownership cannot be transferred, value derives from consumption or experience, quality is difficult to evaluate prior to consumption or purchase.
 
Inseparability – production and consumption cannot be separated (compared with goods where production and consumption are entirely discrete processes)
 Implications of inseparability: Services are typically high contact systems and are labour-intensive; fewer opportunities to transact business at arm's length, fewer opportunities to substitute capital for labour; subject to human error.

Perishability – service performances are ephemeral; unlike physical goods, services cannot be stored or inventoried.
 Implications of perishability: Demand is subject to wide fluctuations, no inventory to serve as a buffer between supply and demand; unused capacity cannot be reserved; high opportunity cost of idle capacity.

Variability (also known as heterogeneity) – services involve processes delivered by service personnel and subject to human variation, customers often seek highly customized solutions, services are inherently variable in quality and substance.
 Implications of variability: Service quality is difficult to manage; fewer opportunities to standardize service delivery.

The unique characteristics of services give rise to problems and challenges that are rarely paralleled in product marketing. Services are complex, multi-dimensional and multi-layered. Not only are there multiple benefits, but there are also a multiplicity of interactions between customers and organizations as well as between customers and other customers.

Framework

Classification of goods and services

There are many ways to classify services. One classification considers who or what is being processed and identifies four classes of services: people processing (e.g. beauty services, child care, medical services); mental stimulus processing (e.g. education services, counselling services, life-coaching), possession processing (e.g. pet care, appliance repair, piano tuning) and information processing (e.g. financial services, data warehousing services). Another method used to classify services uses the degree of customer interaction in the service process and classifies services as high contact (e.g. hospitality, dental care, hairdressing) or low contact  (e.g. telecommunications, utility services).

Both economists and marketers make extensive use of the Search → Experience → Credence (SEC) classification of goods and services. The classification scheme is based on the ease or difficulty of consumer evaluation activities and identifies three broad classes of goods.

 Search goods: are those which possess attributes that can evaluated prior to purchase or consumption. Consumers rely on prior experience, direct product inspection and other information search activities to locate information that assists in the evaluation process. Most products fall into the search goods category (e.g. clothing, office stationery, home furnishings).

 Experience goods: are goods or services that can be accurately evaluated only after the product has been purchased and experiences. Many personal services fall into this category (e.g. restaurant, hairdresser, beauty salon, theme park, travel, holiday).

 Credence claims: are goods or services that are difficult or impossible to evaluate even after consumption has occurred. Evaluation difficulties may arise because the consumer lacks the requisite knowledge or  technical expertise to make a realistic evaluation or, alternatively because the cost of information-acquisition is prohibitive or outweighs the value of the information available. Many professional services fall into this category (e.g. accountant, legal services, medical diagnosis/treatment, cosmetic surgery). These goods are called credence products because the consumer's quality evaluations depend entirely on the trust given to the product manufacturer or service provider.

While some services may possess a number of search attributes (tangible dimensions), most services are high in experience or credence properties.  Empirical studies have shown that consumers' perceived risk increases along the search-experience-credence continuum. The implication is that services tend to be high involvement decisions – where the consumer invests more heavily in information search activities during the purchase decision.

Risk perception and risk reduction in service purchase decisions 

Perceived risk is associated with all purchasing decisions, both products and services alike. In terms of risk perception, marketers and economists argue that perceived purchase risk is higher for experience goods and credence goods with implications for consumer evaluation processes. Given that perceived risk drives the search for information in the pre-purchase stages of the consumer's decision process, consumers of services are more likely to engage in information acquisition activities as a means of ameliorating that risk. Any activity that a consumer undertakes in an effort to reduce perceived risk is known as a risk reduction activity.

Risk perception has been defined as "a perception or feeling "based on consumer's judgments of the likelihood of negative outcomes (uncertainty) and the degree of importance of these outcomes to the individual [consequences]". Thus, pre-purchase risk is a function of two dimensions, namely:

 Uncertainty: the consumer's subjective assessment of the likelihood of occurrence 
 Consequence: the severity of the outcome for the individual in the event that a poor purchase decision is made

For example, consider the case of a prospective air traveler. Most of us know that the probability of being involved in an airline disaster is low (low uncertainty). It is conventional wisdom that travelers are safer in the air than on the roads. Statistically, you are much more likely to be involved in a vehicular accident that an aircraft disaster. While the likelihood of personal harm arising from air travel is indeed very low, the consequences or an airline disaster however are very serious indeed (high consequence).  Whereas, car travelers who have been involved in a traffic accident often walk away with minor injuries, the same cannot be said for airline travelers.  It is the severity of the consequence rather than the uncertainty that plays into airline passengers' fears. Consumers are constantly weighing up uncertainty and consequences to reach subjective evaluations of the overall risk attached to various purchase decisions.

Risk perception drives the information search process. Heightened risk perception may become a barrier to the natural progression of the purchase decision process and prevent customers from making a final brand choice. Consumers who are risk-averse tend to spend more time and effort engaged in information acquisition in the pre-purchase stage and look for specific types of information that will alleviate their perceptions of risk. Typical risk relievers might include such things as a reliance on personal sources of recommendation including word-of-mouth referrals; reliance on known and trusted brands, reading manufacturers' specifications, limited scale trial, reliance on warranties or guarantees etc.

Risk relievers that are especially relevant in service settings include:

High price maintenance: Some evidence suggests that risk-averse consumers often use high price as a guide to quality. Low prices may therefore be counter-productive since they suggest lower quality. Prestige pricing or premium pricing strategies are more likely to be indicated in service settings.

 Limited scale trial: While some services cannot be fully trialled, marketers should think about limited scale trial or a virtual trial. e.g. use computer-aided design to visualize hairstyles, plastic surgery, Many virtual brand sites found online have successfully built of the notion of limited trial.  Other examples include: test driving a software application.

Standardize the Product and Delivery: This is sometimes known as the McDonald's approach. Since variations in quality contribute to higher levels of perceived risk, one technique is to minimize variations by using production line techniques to control standards. This approach may be limited because many customers expect high levels of flexibility and customization as part of the process. Standardization needs to be fully communicated to customers – existing and potential – to be fully effective.

 Purchase from a known or trusted brand: Consumers of services may be more predisposed to use a known, reputable brand as an indicator of quality merchandise. For this reason, service providers are presented with greater opportunities to engage in relationship marketing

Matching supply and demand

Service operations are often characterized by far more uncertainty with respect to the flow of demand. Service firms are often said to be capacity constrained.  This refers to the finite carrying capacity for most service operators and the lack of inventory which serves as a buffer against unexpected or peak demand.

There are two components to capacity (i.e., supply) in service operations:
Number of employees:  In medium and high contact systems, capacity is constrained by the number of contact staff available to provide service.

Size of service environment: Service environments have fixed space. A restaurant has a given number of tables, a hotel has a limited number of rooms, buses and trains are licensed to carry a specified number of passengers.

The factors contributing to uneven demand are more complex and difficult to predict. The components of demand may be seen as comprising long term demand patterns (trends), short term seasonal fluctuations and irregular effects.

Long-term demand patterns: Most industries exhibit underlying trends in demand over longer time frames.  A trend is the long term direction in a time-series. Are sales growing, declining or stable? Often the trend in sales is related to the stage of the product life cycle. For example, industries in growth stages exhibit rapid increases in sales while industries in maturity may find that sales figures reach a plateau. Long-term demand patterns are stable and relatively easy to predict.

Seasonal Factors: Seasonal components are systematic, calendar-related movements in sales.  Seasonal factors are recurring and relatively easy to predict. Seasonal factors might include peak and off peak seasons for a tourist resort. For a restaurant, however, peak seasons might coincide with main meal periods on a daily basis.  Other seasonal factors include trading day trading day effects and holiday periods.

 Irregular Fluctuations:  Irregular fluctuations are unsystematic, short term fluctuations. Irregular effects are highly unpredictable. e.g. inclement weather closes an airport, forcing local hotels to accommodate thousands of guests with minimal advance warning; an unexpected thunder storm leads to a surge in demand for umbrellas.

When demand is low, capacity may be under-utilized while excess demand places enormous pressures on the service system. Service managers need to develop strategies for managing demand and supply under different conditions. Strategies for managing capacity involve careful consideration of both demand-side considerations and supply-side considerations.

On the capacity side:

Add to capacity – hire additional staff (e.g. casuals or temporary staff for peak periods); add to space (e.g. extra floor space in retail, hospitality or increased fleet size in transport services) Increasing capacity may require service re-design and presents a longer term solution to capacity problems.
Reconfigure interior space – with careful reconfiguration of interiors, it may be possible to accommodate a larger number of customers e.g. airline s to add to number of seats by reducing leg room.
Use Customers to Boost Productivity – Customers labour can be harnessed to reduce pressures on the system e.g. self-service, e-ticketing.
Transact business at arm's length – Use the internet or virtual delivery systems to transact business. 
 Ask Customers to use Third Parties – Where possible, have customers use agents or brokers to minimize the number of individual contacts and reduce pressure on the service system.
 Share capacity – it may be possible to share capacity with other businesses e.g. airlines build strategic alliances with other operators so that excess demand can be booked or referred to a known ally (and does not involve  passengers losing frequent flyer points).

On the demand side:

Locate and target market segments with different demand patterns – e.g. a ski resort could develop fishing and sight-seeing packages for bushwalkers and anglers to build demand during traditional off peak seasons.
Develop innovative products for off peak periods – e.g. an airline could develop mystery flights, fly over Antarctica specials, singles flights, blues or jazz flights, gourmet flights, fight sensitivity training flights for nervous travelers, Winter wonderland specials, etc. (a medium term strategy).
Use efficiency based pricing methods – price incentives, such as time-based differential pricing (peak and off peak); market-based differential pricing (e.g. economy and business class); price-volume discounts, use pricing to encourage pre-booking which facilitates superior forecasting  e.g. Car hire company, Uber, uses surge pricing during periods of high demand.
Use reservations systems to manage demand – yield management or dynamic pricing which uses a combination of segment-by-segment demand forecasting alongside subtle price adjustments (requires sophisticated software programs to analyze demand) e.g. hotels and airlines utilize yield management to set prices based on demand patterns.
Use stand-by systems – allow customers the option of taking up last minute vacancies or "no-show" places.
Shape demand- management may attempt to shape demand patterns through customer education programs or lobbying e.g. encourage engaged couples to hold wedding ceremonies on days other than Saturday spread demand more evenly across the days of the week, lobby different state authorities to stagger scheduled school holiday periods in order to spread demand for holiday services more evenly across the year.

When demand exceeds capacity, then reductions in service quality are a probable outcome. Over-crowding and lengthy waiting lines potentially erode the customer experience and place stresses on employees and the service system. Employees may compensate by minimizing the time spent with each customer in an effort to serve more people, but such responses have the potential to introduce human error into service delivery. When capacity far exceeds supply, then capacity becomes idle. Spare capacity is unproductive and an inefficient use of resources. A short-term solution to spare capacity is to seek reductions in operating costs. For instance, management might ask staff to take leave, reduce number of check in counters open, limit number lifts operating and close off entire floors of a building to reduce operating costs during off peak periods as a means of achieving cost savings. In addition, routine maintenance tasks or planned refurbishment activities, which involve downtime, should be carried out during off peak periods to minimize disruption to patrons.

Managing waiting lines

When demand exceeds capacity, customers may have to wait for services. Lovelock identifies a range of different types of waiting lines or queuing systems:

 Single Line/ Single Server Queues: Single line queues are among the most common. Examples can be found in cafes and sandwich bars around town. At Disneyland, for example, single line queues are employed despite the large numbers of visitors. However, Disney provides roving entertainers to visit waiting lines as a form of distraction.

 Parallel Lines/ Multiple Servers: Parallel lines are useful when there is more than one service station. However a major drawback is lines often move at different speeds. When patrons perceive that their line is moving more slowly, it can give rise to a sense of inequity. A variation of this type of queue is to devote some stations to different classes of customer. This variation is used in supermarkets where an express lane can be set up for customers with a small basket of items. It is also used at airport check-in counters where different lines form for economy class passengers and business class passengers.

 Snake Queue: The snake queue employs a physical race to guide customers through to the service station. Its main advantage is that all customers will be served on a first-in, first served basis, which for many people is the fairest system.

 Take a Number: In the take a number system customers do not need to form orderly queues once they have been assigned a number. Instead, customers can relax, enjoy the service firm's facilities until their number is called.

 Other queue systems: Of course, other types of system can be found in service environments. Hospital emergency department, for example, use Triage in which patients are assessed by a triage nurse who ranks the severity of their condition and assigns them to a doctor based on need.

Program

The argument that services require different marketing strategies is based on the insight that services are fundamentally different to goods and that services marketing requires different models to understand the marketing of services to customers. It is believed to be a multi-dimensional construct, but there is little consensus as to what consistutes the specific dimensions. Indeed, some researchers argue that the dimensions of service quality may vary from industry to industry and that no universal set of dimensions exists for all contexts.

Within the services marketing literature, there are several different theoretical traditions that inform the understanding of service quality including the Nordic school, the Gaps model (also known as the American model and the performance only approach.

The Nordic school

The Nordic school was one of the earliest attempts to define and measure service quality. In this school of thought, service quality is conceptualized as consisting of two broad dimensions, namely:

 Technical quality: (What was delivered) 
 Functional quality: (How it was delivered)

The technical dimension can usually be measured – but the functional dimension is difficult to measure due to subjective interpretations which vary from customer to customer.

The Gaps model

The model of service quality or the gaps model as it is popularly known, was developed by team of researchers, Parasuraman, Zeithaml and Berry, in the mid to late 1980s. and has become the dominant approach for identifying service quality problems and diagnosing their probable causes. This approach conceptualizes service quality  as a gap between consumer's expectations of a forthcoming service encounter and their actual perceptions of that encounter. Accordingly, service quality can be represented by the equation:

SQ = P- E
 where

 SQ is service quality
 P is the individual's perceptions of given service delivery
 E is the individual's expectations of a given service delivery

The model which provides the overall conceptual framework helps analysts to identify the service quality gap (Gap 5 in the model) and to understand the probable causes of service quality related problems (Gaps 1-4 in the model). The diagnostic value of the model accounts at least, in part, for the instrument's continuing currency in service quality research.

The model's developers also devised a research instrument, called SERVQUAL, to measure the size and direction of service quality problems (i.e. gap 5). The questionnaire is multi-dimensional instrument, designed to  having capture five dimensions of service quality; namely reliability, assurance, tangibles, empathy and responsiveness, which are believed to represent the consumer's understanding of service quality. The questionnaire consists of matched pairs of items; 22 expectation items and 22 perceptions items, organized into the five dimensions which align with the consumer's mental map of service quality dimensions. Both the expectations component and the perceptions component of the questionnaire consist a total of 22 items, comprising 4 items to capture tangibles, 5 items to capture reliability, 4 items for responsiveness, 5 items for assurance and 5 items to capture empathy. The questionnaire, which is designed to be administered in a face-to-face interview and requires a moderate to large size sample for statistical reliability, is lengthy and can take more than one hour to administer to reach respondent. In practice, researchers customarily add extra items to the 44 SERVQUAL items to capture information about the respondent's demographic profile, prior experience with the brand or category and behavioural intentions (intention to revisit/ repurchase, loyalty intentions and propensity to give word-of-mouth referrals). Thus, the final questionnaire may have up to 60 items, which contributes to substantial time and cost in terms of administration, coding and data analysis.

Performance-only model

Cronin and Taylor developed a scale based on perceived performance only (i.e. excluded expectations) as a simpler alternative to SERVQUAL. The scale is known as SERVPERF and is considerably shorter than SERVQUAL, and therefore easier and cheaper to administer. Results from the use of SERVPERF correlate well with SERVQUAL. This approach utilises a different conceptualisation of service quality, which can be represented by the equation:

SQ = P
 where;

 SQ is service quality
 P is the individual's perceptions of given service delivery

Although SERVPERF has a number of advantages in terms of administration, it has attracted criticism. The performance only instrument lacks the diagnostic value of the SERVQUAL since it includes only one variable (P) compared to SERVQUAL's richer data with two variables (P and E). To illustrate, consider one source of quality related problems which occurs when customers have unrealistically high expectations. SERVQUAL has no problem detecting such problems, however, SERVPERF can never detect this problem because it does not capture expectations. When choosing an appropriate instrument for investigations into service quality, service marketers must weigh up the expediency of SERVPERF against the diagnostic power of SERVQUAL.

Services dominant logic: implications for theory and practice

Service-dominant logic (SDL) is a new way of thinking about marketing, especially the goods versus services division and especially a fresh way of thinking about customer value and the value-creation process. Vargo and Lusch did not intend for service-dominant logic to be published as a workable theory that offers solutions to everyday marketing problems and issues. Instead, it offers a framework for thinking about goods and services. Their work did not put forward hypotheses that could be tested empirically, Instead they offer "foundational propositions".  The original article offered eight such propositions and subsequently added two more propositions to arrive at a total of ten:

Some of the implications that have been identified in the literature include:

SDL offers the promise of a unified marketing theory: To date, marketing research and practice have failed to integrate the traditional goods/services dichotomy. Some efforts have been made to get product accepted as a joint term for goods and services and to use offering, package or solution as all inclusive, concepts for what consumers the buys, but this has not been successful. Service-dominant logic, however, promises a truly unified framework. For many academics, this is the most exciting implication. It is highly likely that the 4 Ps, as the central marketing framework, is about to come to a close.

Compete Through Innovative Co-production and Co-creation: Some theorists point out that, thanks largely to the Internet, consumers have been actively engaging themselves in explicit dialogue with manufacturers and service providers. The challenge is for service firms to find innovative ways to achieve co-production and co-creation. Customer co-creation has become the foundation concept for social sharing web sites such as YouTube, Myspace and Twitter.  Many companies have moved from testing products in the contrived and artificial conditions of a laboratory to product testing in customer environments. At Microsoft, for example, consumers acted as product researchers by testing Windows 2000 in their native environments. A different approach is to use embedded intelligence to provide enhanced personalized experiences.

Research Priorities: SDL has forced the discipline to review its research priorities.  Researchers and scholars are beginning to identify a range of subjects that require more detailed exploration. Some theorists have argued that marketing practitioners must find new ways of understanding customers' value creation and of developing marketing strategies with an aim to engage suppliers with their customers' consumption processes in order to enhance customer satisfaction. Other research priorities include: the personalized customer experience, resource integration, improved use of IT to map processes and activities in order to increase productivity and standardize service.

See also

 Consumer behaviour
 Customer experience
 Destination marketing
 Industrialization of services business model
 Service blueprint
 Service design
 Service quality
 Service system
 Servicescapes
 Service-dominant logic
 Servitization of products business model
 SERVQUAL

References

Further reading
 Alan Wilson, Valarie Zeithaml, Mary Jo Bitner and Dwayne D. Gremler, Services Marketing: Integrating Customer Focus Across the Firm, McGraw Hill. 2012,   
 Harry Beckwith, Selling The Invisible: A field Guide To Modern Marketing, Warner Books, 1997.

External links

Services marketing
Types of marketing
Marketing